Barry James Keith Pryer (1 February 1925 – 15 October 2007) was an English cricketer who played first-class cricket between 1946 and 1950, mostly  for Kent County Cricket Club and Cambridge University. He was born in Plumstead and died in Perth, Western Australia.

Pryer attended the City of London School and served in the Fleet Air Arm before going up to St Catharine's College, Cambridge. A leg-spin bowler and lower-order batsman, he took his best bowling figures of 4 for 25 on his first-class debut for Combined Services against Surrey in 1946. In Cambridge's match against Worcestershire in 1949 he had match figures of 57–19–133–7. His highest score was 75 not out for Cambridge against Middlesex in 1948, when he and Richard Pearsall added an unbeaten 149 in 90 minutes for the ninth wicket.

Pryer and his wife Faye spent some years in the late 1960s and early 1970s in Iraq, where he worked as a lawyer for the Iraq Petroleum Group of Companies in Baghdad. He moved to Australia after his retirement.

References

External links
 

1925 births
2007 deaths
English cricketers
People educated at the City of London School
Royal Navy personnel of World War II
Alumni of St Catharine's College, Cambridge
Kent cricketers
Cambridge University cricketers
Combined Services cricketers
Free Foresters cricketers